Al Thakhira is a town on the coast of the Al Khor municipality in Qatar, about  northeast of the city of Al Khor City and  from the capital Doha. It is closely affiliated with Al Khor City, with both having been founded by the Al Muhannadi tribe. Like other coastal settlements in the area, its inhabitants historically relied solely on pearling and fishing for sustenance.

Etymology
Al Thakhira translates to 'ammunition' in English. There are two prevalent theories regarding the origin of this name. The first theory states that its inhabitants used to keep large reserves of food, money and weapons. Another theory alleges that the town was named by a group of sailors who had lost their bearings. After finding and docking at Al Thakhira, they set out to look for food, taking with them their weapons and ammunition.

Alternative forms of the name include Ad Dhakhīrah, Adh Dhukhayr, and Al Zakhira.

Geography

Together with Al Khor City, roughly 1,392 hectares of mangroves are found just off the coast, making the coastline between Al Thakhira and Al Khor City the most densely populated mangrove habitat in Qatar.

Furthermore, the waters had a salinity of 49.04 psu, an average temperature of 24.66°C and 6.64 mg/L of dissolved oxygen.

Al Thakhira Reserve
The area is home to Al Thakhira Nature Reserve, which encompasses the small island mangrove-covered island of Umm Far, parts of the coastline, and multiple wadis and sabkhas. Mangroves are very common in the reserve, and it is one of the few areas of Qatar to boast natural tree growth.

History
J.G. Lorimer's Gazetteer of the Persian Gulf gives an account of Al Thakhira in 1908:

Development

RRC STUDIO Architects Milan was behind a project to expand Al Thakhira two-fold in preparation for the 2022 FIFA World Cup. As part of the project, 275,000 m² of new commercial and residential infrastructure was created. Protected areas for mangroves in the town's north and south sectors were also designated.

Administration
When free elections of the Central Municipal Council first took place in Qatar during 1999, Al Thakhira was designated the seat of constituency no. 27. It would remain the headquarters of constituency no. 27 for the next three consecutive elections until the fifth municipal elections in 2015, when it was made the headquarters of constituency no. 26. Also included in its constituency is part of Simaisma, Umm Birka, and Ras Laffan. In the inaugural municipal elections in 1999, Ali Hassan Al-Mohannadi won the elections, receiving 34.4%, or 65 votes. The runner-up candidate was Salem Abdullah Al-Shahwani, whose share of the votes was 19.3%, or 42 votes. Voter turnout was 90.5%. Al-Mohannadi retained his seat in the 2002 and 2007 elections. In 2011, Hamad Lahan Al Mohannadi was elected, and retained his position in the 2015 elections.

Al Thakhira recorded the highest voter turnout percentage at 73.8% in the 2019 municipal elections.

Landmarks

Harbor
Fardhat Al Thakhira Harbor serves the town's fishing industry, of which there are plans to expand in the near future as of 2017.

Beach

Al Thakhira Beach is one of the largest tourist attractions in the town. Running for approximately 10 km, much of its coast is made up of sabkhas (salt flats). Salt-resistant mangroves grow abundantly along its coast. It is a popular spot for bird watchers. Furthermore, it is a popular spot for kayaking and fishing. Sea-turtles are known to regularly nest on this beach during late Spring and early Summer. It is one of the best-preserved beaches in Qatar and receives periodic renovations and cleanups under the auspices of the Ministry of Municipality and Environment (MME).

In March 2019, the 1,800 meter-long and two meter-wide Al Thakhira Walkway was opened alongside the beach. The promenade features a 1,250 m² playground, 93 light poles, dozens of seating areas and a 2,000 meter-long cycle route.

Parks
In 2009, a major park was opened in Al Thakhira covering an area of 14,580 m². Sharq Garden, a public park, was inaugurated in March 2019. It spans an area of 4,841 m², of which about 3,500 m² comprises vegetated areas. A footpath stretching for 320 meters and with a width of two meters runs through the park.

Sports
Al Thakhira has its own amateur football league. In 2005, Al Thakhira FC was formed and has competed in the QFA-sanctioned Qatar Amateur League since 2013.

A recreational facility known as Al Dhakhira Club was established in 1997. The club hosts a barbershop, a south-east Asian restaurant, a children's play area, a lounge and several sports courts. Also nestled in the town is Al Thakhira Youth Center, an affiliate of the Ministry of Culture and Sports. It was established in 2006.

Education
The following schools are located in Al Thakhira:

Demographics

Gallery

References

Further reading

Al Khor
Populated places in Al Khor
Populated coastal places in Qatar